SSM may refer to:

Arts and entertainment
 Sakıp Sabancı Museum, an art museum in Istanbul, Turkey
 SSM (band), a post punk/garage/psych rock band from Detroit, Michigan, formed in 2005

Organizations
 Companies Commission of Malaysia (Suruhanjaya Syarikat Malaysia)
 Federation of Trade Unions of Macedonia (Сојуз на синдикатите на Македонија)
 Georgian Public Broadcasting (Sakartvelos Sazogadoebrivi Mauts'q'ebeli)
 Sarawak Sovereignty Movement, Kuching, Sarawak, Malaysia
 Scuola Svizzera di Milano, a Swiss international school in Milan, Italy
 Shattuck-Saint Mary's, a coeducational Episcopal-affiliated boarding school in Faribault, Minnesota, US
 Socialist Union of Youth (Socialistický svaz mládeže), an organization in the former Czechoslovakia
 SSM Health, St. Louis, Missouri, US
 Society for Social Medicine, UK
 Society of the Sacred Mission, an Anglican religious order
 Society of Saint Margaret, an Anglican religious order
 Swedish Radiation Safety Authority (Strålsäkerhetsmyndigheten)
 Swiss School of Management, a business school located at Bellinzona, Switzerland
 Swiss Society for Microbiology, the professional association of Swiss microbiologists

Computing
 Silicon secured memory, SPARC encryption technology
 Source-specific multicast, in computer networking
 Standard shadow map, in computer graphics

Medicine
 Ssm6a, Scolopendra subspinipes mutilans 6, or μ-SLPTX-Ssm6a, is a toxin from the venom of the Chinese red-headed centipede.
 SSMEM1, Serine-rich single-pass membrane protein 1 is a protein that in humans is encoded by the SSMEM1 gene.
 Sleep state misperception, a term used to classify sleep disorders
 Slipped strand mispairing, a mutation process during DNA replication
 Social Science & Medicine, a peer-reviewed journal
 Special study module, now student selected component, an option in medical schools in the UK
 Superficial spreading melanoma, a type of cancer
 System status management, of emergency medical services

Other science and technology
 Scanning SQUID microscope, a magnetic current imaging system
 Semi-solid metal casting, in the production of aluminium or magnesium parts
 Special sensor microwave/imager, is a seven-channel, four-frequency, linearly polarized passive microwave radiometer system
 Spectral submanifold, a type of invariant manifold in nonlinear dynamical systems
 Standard solar model, a mathematical treatment of the Sun as a spherical ball of gas in cosmology
 Startup, shutdowns, and malfunctions, in potentially polluting industrial plants

Military appointments and decorations
 Grand Commander of the Order of Loyalty to the Crown of Malaysia
 Special Service Medal (Canada), awarded to members of the Canadian Forces
 Squadron sergeant major, in some Commonwealth armies
 Staff sergeant major, in some Commonwealth armies

Weaponry
 Ship-to-ship missile
 Surface-to-ship missile
 Surface-to-surface missile
 SSM-1, the Japanese Type 88 Surface-to-Ship Missile
 SSM-1B, the Japanese Type 90 Ship-to-Ship Missile
 SSM-700K Haeseong, a South Korean ship-launched sea-skimming surface-to-surface anti-ship cruise missile
 SSM-A-5 Boojum, a United States Air Force cruise missile
 SSM-A-23 Dart, an anti-tank guided missile developed for the United States Army
 SSM-N-8 Regulus, a United States Navy cruise missile, 1955–1964
 SSM-N-9 Regulus II, a United States Navy cruise missile

Other uses
 Honda SSM, a concept car introduced at the 1995 Tokyo Motor Show
 Sam Schmidt Motorsports, an auto racing team
 Self-supporting minister, an unpaid priest in the Church of England and Church of Ireland
 Single Supervisory Mechanism, whereby the European Central Bank supervises banks' stability
 Special Safeguard Mechanism, a World Trade Organization tool that allows developing countries to raise tariffs temporarily to deal with import surges or price falls
 Strategic service management, optimization of a company's post-sale service
 Soft systems methodology, a problem-solving method
 Same-sex marriage, a marriage between two people of the same legal sex